The 2004 Players Championship was a golf tournament in Florida on the PGA Tour, held  at TPC Sawgrass in Ponte Vedra Beach, southeast of Jacksonville. It was the 31st Players Championship.

Adam Scott, age 23, held on for his second PGA Tour title, one stroke ahead of runner-up Pádraig Harrington, who started the final round five shots behind.  With a two-shot lead on the 72nd hole, Scott put his approach shot in the water then sank a  putt for bogey to win.

Defending champion Davis Love III finished twelve strokes back, in a tie for 33rd place.

Scott was the youngest champion for thirteen years, until Kim Si-woo won at age 21 in 2017. Previously, it was Fred Couples, age 24 in 1984.

Venue

Field
Stephen Allan, Robert Allenby, Stephen Ames, Billy Andrade, Stuart Appleby, Tommy Armour III, Woody Austin, Aaron Baddeley, Briny Baird, Craig Barlow, Pat Bates, Cameron Beckman, Rich Beem, Notah Begay III, Thomas Bjørn, Jeff Brehaut, Mark Brooks, Bob Burns, Jonathan Byrd, Tom Byrum, Mark Calcavecchia, Chad Campbell, Paul Casey, Alex Čejka, K. J. Choi, Stewart Cink, Tim Clark, Darren Clarke, Fred Couples, Ben Crane, Ben Curtis, John Daly, Robert Damron, Brian Davis, Glen Day, Chris DiMarco, Luke Donald, Joe Durant, Steve Elkington, Ernie Els, Bob Estes, Nick Faldo, Brad Faxon, Todd Fischer, Steve Flesch, Carlos Franco, Harrison Frazar, David Frost, Fred Funk, Robert Gamez, Sergio García, Brent Geiberger, Matt Gogel, Retief Goosen, David Gossett, Jay Haas, Todd Hamilton, Pádraig Harrington, J. P. Hayes, J. J. Henry, Tim Herron, Glen Hnatiuk, Scott Hoch, Charles Howell III, John Huston, Trevor Immelman, Peter Jacobsen, Freddie Jacobson, Lee Janzen, Brandt Jobe, Richard S. Johnson, Kent Jones, Jonathan Kaye, Jerry Kelly, Skip Kendall, Cliff Kresge, Matt Kuchar, Hank Kuehne, Neal Lancaster, Bernhard Langer, Paul Lawrie, Stephen Leaney, Tom Lehman, Justin Leonard, J. L. Lewis, Frank Lickliter, Peter Lonard, Davis Love III, Steve Lowery, Jeff Maggert, Shigeki Maruyama, Len Mattiace, Billy Mayfair, Scott McCarron, Spike McRoy, Shaun Micheel, Phil Mickelson, Colin Montgomerie, Greg Norman, Arron Oberholser, Geoff Ogilvy, José María Olazábal, Rod Pampling, Brenden Pappas, Jesper Parnevik, Craig Parry, Corey Pavin, David Peoples, Pat Perez, Craig Perks, Tom Pernice Jr., Kenny Perry, Tim Petrovic, Carl Pettersson, Ian Poulter, Nick Price, Brett Quigley, John Riegger, Chris Riley, Loren Roberts, John Rollins, Justin Rose, Rory Sabbatini, Gene Sauers, Adam Scott, John Senden, Patrick Sheehan, Joey Sindelar, Vijay Singh, Heath Slocum, Jeff Sluman, Chris Smith, Craig Stadler, Paul Stankowski, Steve Stricker, Kevin Sutherland, Hal Sutton, Hidemichi Tanaka, Esteban Toledo, David Toms, Kirk Triplett, Bob Tway, Scott Verplank, Duffy Waldorf, Mike Weir, Jay Williamson, Dean Wilson, Tiger Woods

Round summaries

First round
Thursday, March 25, 2004

Source:

Second round
Friday, March 26, 2004

Source:

Third round
Saturday, March 27, 2004

Source:

Final round
Sunday, March 28, 2004

Scorecard
Final round

Cumulative tournament scores, relative to par

Source:

References

External links
The Players Championship website
Full Leaderboard

2004
2004 in golf
2004 in American sports
2004 in sports in Florida
March 2004 sports events in the United States